This is a list of German television related events from 1986.

Events
27 March - Ingrid Peters is selected to represent Germany at the 1986 Eurovision Song Contest with her song "Über die Brücke geh'n". She is selected to be the thirty-first German Eurovision entry during Ein Lied für Bergen held at the German Theatre in Munich.

Debuts

ARD
 6 January – Engels & Consorten (1986)
 8 January – 
 Der Leihopa (1986–1988)
 Lauter Glückspilze (1986)
 13 February – Schloßherren (1986)
 17 February – Liebling Kreuzberg (1986–1998)
 21 February – Tante Tilly  (1986)
 22 April – Detektivbüro Roth (1986–1987)
 2 June – Die Montagsfamilie (1986–1987) 
 5 June – Ein heikler Fall  (1986–1988) 
 22 September – Kir Royal (1986)
 26 September – Kanal fatal (1986–2011) 
 29 September –  Losberg (1986–1988)
 5 October –  (1986)
 9 October – Irgendwie und sowieso (1986)
 13 October – Ein Stück aus ihrem Leben (1986–1987)
 12 November – Väter und Söhne – Eine deutsche Tragödie (1986)
6 December –   Miami Vice (1984– 1989)
8 December –  Roncalli (1986–1987) 
16 December – Großstadtrevier (1986–Present) 
29 December – Anton, wohin? (1986–1988)

ZDF
 18 March –  Alles was Recht ist (1986)
 27 March – Wanderjahre (1986)
 3 September – 
 Rette mich, wer kann (1986)
 Urlaub auf italienisch  (1986)
 25 September – 
  S.Y. Arche Noah (1986)
 Hessische Geschichten (1986–1994)
 21 October – Die Wicherts von nebenan (1986–1991)
 31 October – Mit meinen heißen Tränen (1986)

DFF
 20 February –  Alfons Zitterbacke (1986)
 23 February –  Treffpunkt Flughafen (1986)
 25 February – Neumanns Geschichten (1986)
 3 October – Rund um die Uhr (1986)

3sat
 29 March – Unternehmen Köpenick (1986)

Armed Forces Network
 ALF (1986–1990)

BFBS
3 April -  Running Scared (1986)
28 May -  The December Rose (1986)
 The Giddy Game Show (1985-1987)
 The Really Wild Show (1986-2006)
 Farrington of the F.O. (1986-1987)
 Wizbit (1986-1988)
 Pinny's House (1986)

Television shows

1950s
Tagesschau (1952–present)

1960s
 heute (1963-present)

1970s
 heute-journal (1978-present)
 Tagesthemen (1978-present)

1980s
Wetten, dass..? (1981-2014)
 Sketchup (1984-1986)
Lindenstraße (1985–present)

Ending this year

Births
3 March - Sandra Rieß, TV & radio host

Deaths